Rhoda, Lady Birley ( Pike; 3 February 1899 – 1981) was an Anglo-Irish gardener, model, and artist. She developed the gardens at Charleston Manor in East Sussex where she founded the festival that has continued after her death.

Life
Birley was born on 3 February 1899 as Rhoda Vava Mary Lecky Pike to Catherine ( Howard) and Robert Lecky Pike, who was the High Sheriff of Carlow and was keen on cricket. Her parents lived at Kilknock House, County Carlow. Scottish sculptor William Reid Dick, created a bust of her.

In her home town of Tullow, County Carlow, on 14 September 1921, she married Oswald Birley from New Zealand. Oswald was in the army but would later become a society portrait painter. In 1922, their daughter, Maxine, was born. She became a model and actress who married Count Alain Le Bailly de La Falaise and later John McKendry, the curator of prints and photographs at the Metropolitan Museum of Art. Their other child, Mark, was born in 1930 when her husband was fifty. Mark would in time found Annabel's nightclub, which he named for his wife.

In 1931, she and Oswald bought Charleston Manor in East Sussex which dated from the 12th century and featured a Norman hall. The manor had been empty for some years and in 1932 they employed the architect and garden designer Walter Godfrey to restore it and to create a concert hall out of an old barn. She tasked herself with rebuilding the gardens. She and her husband are credited with planting them. She was a keen and eccentric gardener and would feed fish stew to her roses. Her daughter said that she would forget what the stew was for and would add cognac and garlic to the concoction and the "Roses almost cried out with pleasure". It was said that she fed her roses Lobster Thermidor made with cognac.

Rhoda Birley founded the Charleston Manor Festival and it was first called the Sussex Festival. The festival emerged from poetry recitals, readings and talks that she organised at their home over four or five weekends starting in about 1935. Her husband died at their home in London in 1952, but this did not stop the festival.

Death and legacy
After her death in 1981 the manor was sold. However the gardens and manor remain and are grade II listed. The festival has had fallow times but it was still running in 1996.

Birley's descendants include Robin Birley and India Jane Birley. Other descendants include the fashion designer Loulou de la Falaise. Loulou de la Falaise's niece is the fashion model Lucie de la Falaise.

References

1899 births
1981 deaths
Birley family
Horticulturists
Irish women painters
People from County Carlow
People from East Sussex
Wives of knights
Date of death missing